The Lady Penitent is a series of novels by Lisa Smedman, set in the Forgotten Realms campaign setting based on the Dungeons & Dragons fantasy role-playing game.

Plot summary
The Lady Penitent takes place after the events of War of the Spider Queen, ranging from 1372 DR to 1379 DR. Several fairly large realm-changing events take place during this series, ranging from the use of Elven High Magic on the drow race to the death of several deities.

Contents
 Sacrifice of the Widow (paperback, February 2007)
 Storm of the Dead (paperback, August 2007)
 Ascendancy of the Last (paperback, June 2008)

References

American novel series
Fantasy novel series
Forgotten Realms novel series